Joseph Neild Compton (25 September 1900 – 19 September 1965) was a British sailor. He competed in the 8 Metre event at the 1936 Summer Olympics.

References

External links
 

1900 births
1965 deaths
British male sailors (sport)
Olympic sailors of Great Britain
Sailors at the 1936 Summer Olympics – 8 Metre
People from Lewisham
English cricketers
Europeans cricketers